The International Journal of Comparative Sociology is a bimonthly peer-reviewed academic journal covering the field of comparative sociology. The editors is David A. Smith (University of California Irvine). It was established by Brill Publishers in 1960 and was acquired by SAGE Publications in 2001.

Abstracting and indexing 
The journal is abstracted and indexed in, among other databases:  Scopus and the Social Sciences Citation Index.  According to the Journal Citation Reports, the journal has a 2021 impact factor of 2.156.

References

External links 
 

SAGE Publishing academic journals
English-language journals